Yucca is a genus in the plant family Asparagaceae containing species commonly known as yuccas.

Yucca may also refer to:

Hesperoyucca whipplei, a species of flowering plant closely related to, and formerly usually included in, the genus Yucca

Places
Yucca, Arizona
Yucca, California, alternate name of Muroc, California
Yucca Flat, a nuclear test region within the Nevada Test Site
Yucca Mountain, Nevada
Yucca Valley, California

See also
Yucca House National Monument, Colorado
Yucca Mountain nuclear waste repository, Nevada
Yuka (disambiguation)
Yukka